Aforia obesa is a species of sea snails, a marine gastropod mollusc in the family Cochlespiridae.

Distribution
This species is found in deep waters of the Southwestern Atlantic Ocean off Argentina.

References

 Pastorino G. & Sánchez N. (2016). Southwestern Atlantic species of conoidean gastropods of the genus Aforia Dall, 1889. Zootaxa. 4109(4): 458–470

obesa
Gastropods described in 2016